Wattis is a surname. Notable people with the surname include:

Edmund Orson Wattis Jr. (1855–1934), American businessman
Edmund Wattis Littlefield (1914–2001), American businessman
Phyllis Wattis (1905–2002), American art patron
Richard Wattis (1912–1975), British actor
William Henry Wattis (1859–1931), American businessman

English-language surnames